Like all municipalities of Puerto Rico, Naguabo is subdivided into administrative units called barrios, which are roughly comparable to minor civil divisions, (and means wards or boroughs or neighborhoods in English). The barrios and subbarrios, in turn, are further subdivided into smaller local populated place areas/units called sectores (sectors in English). The types of sectores may vary, from normally sector to urbanización to reparto to barriada to residencial, among others. Some sectors appear in two barrios.

List of sectors by barrio

Daguao

	Parcelas Esperanza
	Parcelas Nuevas
	Parcelas Viejas
	Sector Armando Medina
	Sector Cipey
	Sector Cuesta Esperanza
	Sector Daguao Arriba
	Sector El Corcho
	Sector Fanguito
	Sector Los Millones
	Sector Medina
	Sector Shangai
	Urbanización Casa Bella
	Urbanización Hacienda Grande
	Urbanización Promised Land

Duque

	Camino Municipal
	Parcelas Duque
	Parcelas Invasión
	Reparto Santiago
	Sector Dávila
	Sector Hacienda Correas
	Sector La Sierra
	Sector Paraíso Cabrera (El Pueblito)
	Sector Pomales
	Sector Ramos
	Sector Rivieras del Río
	Sector San Cristóbal
	Sector Tablones
	Sector Villa Awilda
	Urbanización Juan Mendoza
	Urbanización La Quinta
	Villa del Rosario

Húcares

	Calle Punta Lima
	Estancias de Húcares
	Hacienda El Triunfo
	Las Mercedes (Calle de la Playa)
	Mansiones de Playa Húcares
	Parcelas Invasión
	Parcelas Nuevas
	Parcelas Playa
	Residencial Húcares I y II
	Sector Calle del Pueblo
	Sector Cambímbora
	Sector El Faro
	Sector Fanduca
	Sector La Changa
	Sector La Ola
	Urbanización Cala de Húcares
	Urbanización Jardín del Este
	Urbanización Lomas de Santo Tomás
	Urbanización Los Valles
	Urbanización Mar Caribe
	Urbanización Santo Tomás

Maizales

	La Pitina
	Loma del Viento
	Parcelas La Fe
	Parcelas Maizales
	Rancho Grande
	Sector Capiro
	Sector Cecilia
	Sector Colonia La Fe
	Sector El Cabro
	Sector Los Ramírez
	Sector Ponderosa
	Sector Rincón
	Urbanización Vista Verde

Mariana

	Barriada Ensanche Relámpago
	Comunidad Finquitas
	Parcelas Mariana
	Quebrada Palma
	Sector Agosto
	Sector Alturas de Mariana (Sector Santiago y Lima)
	Sector Arenas Blancas
	Sector Botijita
	Sector Daguao Arriba
	Sector El Banco
	Sector José Lima
	Sector La Coroza
	Sector La Paloma
	Sector La Vega
	Sector Las Malangas
	Sector Limones
	Sector Los Romanes
	Sector Marzot
	Sector Rincón

Naguabo barrio-pueblo

	Barriada Salsipuedes (Calle José de Diego)
	Calle Armando González
	Calle Buenos Aires
	Calles del Casco del Pueblo
	Carretera Militar (from Caserío until Centro de Diagnóstico)
	Central El Triunfo
	Edificio Cabrera
	Edificio Inés María Mendoza
	Residencial Ignacio Morales Dávila
	Residencial Naguabo Valley
	Sector Loma El Triunfo
	Urbanización Brisas de Naguabo
	Urbanización City Palace I
	Urbanización City Palace II
	Urbanización El Duque (Los Maestros)
	Urbanización Jardines de la Vía
	Urbanización Riberas del Río

Peña Pobre

	Callejón Mendoza
	Parcelas Nuevas
	Parcelas Playa
	Parcelas Viejas
	Sector Centro
	Sector Ciénaga
	Sector El Molino Rojo
	Sector El Pilón
	Sector Fanduca
	Sector Higüerillo
	Sector La Loma
	Sector La Suiza
	Sector Los Benítez
	Sector Mambiche Blanco
	Sector Medianía Alta
	Sector Medianía
	Sector Peña Pobre Abajo
	Sector Peña Pobre Arriba
	Sector Villa Terapia
	Urbanización Villa de Monte Cristo

Río

	Extensión Diplo
	Extensión Diplo III
	Residencial Torres del Río
	Residencial Villa del Río
	Row House
	Sector Brazo Seco
	Urbanización Brisas del Valle
	Urbanización Ciudad Dorada
	Urbanización Jardines de la Esperanza
	Urbanización Praderas del Este
	Urbanización Ramón Rivero
	Urbanización Tropical Beach
	Urbanización Vistas de Naguabo

Río Blanco

	Finca San Eladio
	Parcelas Río Blanco
	Parcelas Sector Común
	Sector Camino Viejo
	Sector Común
	Sector Cubuy
	Sector El Fuego
	Sector El Puente
	Sector Florida
	Sector La Cuchilla
	Sector La Joba
	Sector La Mina
	Sector Río Blanco Arriba
	Urbanización Río Blanco Heights
	Urbanización Vistas de Río Blanco

Santiago y Lima

	Carretera 31 (from El Gravero until Edificio Rodríguez)
	Edificio Rodríguez
	Parcelas Nuevas
	Parcelas Viejas
	Reparto Maribel
	Sector La Altura
	Sector Monte Soco
	Sector Morrillo

See also

List of communities in Puerto Rico

References

Naguabo
Naguabo